Starting Over is a 2007 Scottish romantic drama television film directed by Giles Foster, produced by the British company Gate Television Productions for the German television channel Zweites Deutsches Fernsehen (ZDF).  Based on the 2002 novel of the same name by Robin Pilcher, the film stars Suzanne von Borsody, Iain Glen and Rutger Hauer.

Plot summary
The film explores how an aristocratic woman's life changes when her brother dies and her marriage breaks down. Lady Elizabeth Dewhurst (Suzanne von Borsody) believes her husband Gregor (Iain Glen) is at fault for the accidental death of her beloved brother Simon (William Mickleburgh).  Their marriage has been rocky, but this is the last straw and she asks him to move out of the household.  Elizabeth's best friend Mary Phillips (Rachel Fielding) has had her eye on Gregor for some time and sees this as her chance.  She encourages them to use the services of a powerful but shady family attorney, Mr. Sharp (Jonathan Coy), and Sharp expects to benefit financially from the division of the Dewherst estate.  Peter Rosen (Rutger Hauer) is visiting from a local University.  Liz is drawn to him for a mild affair, even though he is the professor of her son Alex (Daniel Sharman).

Cast
 Suzanne von Borsody as Lady Elizabeth Dewhurst
 Iain Glen as Gregor Dewhurst
 Rutger Hauer as Peter Rossen
 Jonathan Coy as David Sharp
 Colette O'Neil as Mrs Lawson
 Richard Addison as Mr. Hamilton 
 Daniel Sharman as Alexander Dewhurst
 Rachel Fielding as Mary Phillips
 William Mickleburgh as Simon McNichols
Leeann Watson (nee Dodds) as extra in lecture hall.

Production
The story is set in Scotland. The film was shot in Scotland in July and August 2007.

Release
The film had its television premiere on 26 December 2007.

References

External links
 

German television films
2007 films
2007 television films
English-language German films
2000s German-language films
2007 romantic drama films
British romantic drama films
Films shot in Edinburgh
Television shows based on British novels
Films directed by Giles Foster
2000s British films
British drama television films
ZDF original programming